Opossums are a large order of marsupials in the Western Hemisphere.

Opossum or opossom may also refer to:

Animals
Opossum rat, a species of rodent in the family Muridae
Monommatinae, also known as the opossum beetle 
Mysida, also known as opossum shrimp, group of small, shrimp-like crustaceans

Places
Opossum Bay, a town located in Tasmania, Australia
Opossum Creek, a stream in Kansas
Opossum Run, a stream in Ohio

Other uses
HMS Opossum, a series of submarines of the British Royal Navy
Opossom (band), a New Zealand band including musician Kody Nielson

See also
Possum (disambiguation)